Tanystropheus (~ 'long' +  'hinged') is an extinct genus of  archosauromorph reptile from the Middle and Late Triassic epochs. The neck was composed of 12–13 extremely elongated vertebrae. With its very long but relatively stiff neck, Tanystropheus has been often proposed and reconstructed as an aquatic or semi-aquatic reptile, an interpretation supported by the fact that the creature is most commonly found in semi-aquatic fossil sites where known terrestrial reptile remains are scarce. Complete skeletons are common in the Besano Formation at Monte San Giorgio in Italy and Switzerland; other fossils have been found throughout Europe, North America, and Asia, dating from the Middle Triassic (Anisian and Ladinian stages) to the early part of the Late Triassic (earliest Carnian stage).

History and species

Monte San Giorgio species 

19th century excavations at Monte San Giorgio, a UNESCO world heritage site on the Italy-Switzerland border, revealed a fragmentary fossil of an animal with three-cusped (tricuspid) teeth and elongated bones. Monte San Giorgio preserves the Besano Formation (also known as the Grenzbitumenzone), a late Anisian-early Ladinian lagerstätte recognised for its spectacular fossils. In 1886, Francesco Bassani interpreted the unusual tricuspid fossil as a pterosaur, which he named Tribelesodon longobardicus. The holotype specimen of Tribelesodon longobardicus was stored in the Museo Civico di Storia Naturale di Milano (Natural History Museum of Milan), and was destroyed by allied bombing of Milan in World War II.

Excavations by University of Zürich paleontologist Bernhard Peyer in the late 1920s and 1930s revealed many more complete fossils of the species from Monte San Giorgio. Peyer's discoveries allowed Tribelesodon longobardicus to be recognised as a non-flying reptile, more than 40 years after its original description. Its supposed elongated finger bones were recognized as neck vertebrae, which compared favorably with those previously described as Tanystropheus from Germany and Poland. Thus, Tribelesodon longobardicus was renamed to Tanystropheus longobardicus and its anatomy was revised into a long-necked, non-pterosaur reptile. Specimen PIMUZ T 2791, which was discovered in 1929, has been designated as the neotype of the species.

Well-preserved T. longobardicus fossils continue to be recovered from Monte San Giorgio up to the present day. Fossils from the mountain are primarily stored at the rebuilt Museo Civico di Storia Naturale di Milano (MSNM), the Paleontological Museum of Zürich (PIMUZ), and the Museo Cantonale di Scienze Naturali di Lugano (MCSN). Rupert Wild reviewed and redescribed all specimens known at the time via several large monographs in 1973/4 and 1980. In 2005, Silvio Renesto described a T. longobardicus specimen from Switzerland which preserved the impressions of skin and other soft tissue. Five new MSNM specimens of T. longobardicus were described by Stefania Nosotti in 2007, allowing for a more comprehensive view of the species' anatomy.

A small but well-preserved skull and neck, specimen PIMUZ T 3901, was found in the slightly younger Meride Limestone at Monte San Giorgio. Wild (1980) gave it a new species, T. meridensis, based on a set of skull and vertebral traits proposed to differ from T. longobardicus. Later reinvestigations failed to confirm the validity of these differences, rendering T. meridensis a junior synonym of T. longobardicus. A 2019 revision of Tanystropheus found that T. longobardicus and T. antiquus were the only valid species in the genus. In 2020, large Tanystropheus specimens from Monte San Giorgio originally assigned to T. longobardicus were given a new species, T. hydroides.

Polish and German species 

The first Tanystropheus specimens to be described were found in the mid-19th century. They included eight large vertebrae from the Upper Muschelkalk of Germany, and a partial skeleton from the Lower Keuper of Poland. These geological units occupy part of the Middle Triassic, from the latest Anisian to middle Ladinian stages. Though the fossils were initially given the name Macroscelosaurus by Count Georg Zu Münster, the publication containing this name is lost and its genus is considered a nomen oblitum. In 1855, Hermann von Meyer supplied the name Tanystropheus conspicuus, the type species of Tanystropheus, to the fossils. They were later regarded as Tanystropheus fossils undiagnostic relative to other species, rendering T. conspicuus a nomen dubium possibly synonymous with T. hydroides.

In the late 1900s, Friedrich von Huene named several dubious Tanystropheus species from Germany and Poland. T. posthumus, from the Norian of Germany, was later reevaluated as an indeterminate theropod vertebra and a nomen dubium. Several more von Huene species, including "Procerosaurus cruralis", "Thecodontosaurus latespinatus", and "Thecodontosaurus primus", have been reconsidered as indeterminate material of Tanystropheus or other archosauromorphs.

One of Von Huene's species appears to be valid: T. antiquus, from the Gogolin Formation of Poland, was based on cervical vertebrae which were proportionally shorter than those of other Tanystropheus species. Long considered destroyed in World War II, several T. antiquus fossils were rediscovered in the late 2010s. The proportions of T. antiquus fossils are easily distinguishable, and it is currently considered a valid species of archosauromorph, though its referral to the genus Tanystropheus has been questioned. The Gogolin Formation ranges from the upper Olenekian (latest part of the Early Triassic) to the lower Anisian in age. Assuming they belong within Tanystropheus, the fossils of T. antiquus may be the oldest in the genus. Specimens likely referable to T. antiquus are also known from throughout Germany and the fossiliferous Winterswijk site in the Netherlands.

Other Tanystropheus fossils 
In the 1880s, E.D. Cope named three supposed new Tanystropheus species (T. bauri, T. willistoni, and T. longicollis) from the Late Triassic Chinle Formation in New Mexico. However, these fossils were later determined to be tail vertebrae belonging to theropod dinosaurs, which were named under the new genus Coelophysis. Authentic Tanystropheus specimens from the Makhtesh Ramon in Israel were described as a new species, T. haasi, in 2001. However, this species may be dubious due to the difficulty of distinguishing its vertebrae from T. conspicuus or T. longobardicus. Another new species, T. biharicus, was described from Romania in 1975. It has also been considered possibly synonymous with T. longobardicus. A Tanystropheus-like vertebra from the middle Ladinian Erfurt Formation (Lettenkeuper) of Germany was described in 1846 as one of several fossils gathered under the name "Zanclodon laevis". Though likely the first Tanystropheus fossil to be discovered, the vertebra is now lost, and surviving jaw fragments and other fossil scraps of "Zanclodon laevis" represent indeterminate archosauriforms with no relation to Tanystropheus.

The most well-preserved Tanystropheus fossils outside of Monte San Giorgio come from the Guizhou province of China, as described by Li (2007) and Rieppel (2010). They are also the youngest and easternmost fossils in the genus, hailing from the upper Ladinian or lower Carnian Zhuganpo Formation. Although the postcrania is complete and indistinguishable from the fossils of Monte San Giorgio, no skull material is preserved, and their younger age precludes unambiguous placement into any Tanystropheus species. The Chinese material includes a large morphotype (T. hydroides?) specimen, GMPKU-P-1527, and an indeterminate juvenile skeleton, IVPP V 14472.

Indeterminate Tanystropheus remains are also known from the Jilh Formation of Saudi Arabia and various Anisian-Ladinian sites in Spain, France, Italy, and Switzerland. The youngest Tanystropheus fossil in Europe is a vertebra from the lower Carnian Fusea site in Friuli, Italy. In 2015, a large Tanystropheus cervical vertebra was described from the Economy Member of the Wolfville Formation, in the Bay of Fundy of Nova Scotia, Canada. The Wolfville Formation spans the Anisian to Carnian stages, and the Economy Member is likely Middle Triassic (Anisian-Ladinian) in age. It is a rare example of predominantly freshwater strata preserving Tanystropheus fossils. Tanystropheus-like tanystropheid fossils are known from another freshwater formation in North America: the Anisian-age Moenkopi Formation of Arizona and New Mexico.

Several new tanystropheid genera have been named from former Tanystropheus fossils. Fossils from the Anisian Röt Formation in Germany, previously referred to Tanystropheus antiquus, were named as a new genus and species in 2006: Amotosaurus rotfeldensis. In 2011, fossils from the Lipovskaya Formation of Russia were given the new genus and species Augustaburiana vatagini by A.G. Sennikov. He also named the new genus Protanystropheus for T. antiquus, though some other authors have continued to retain that species within Tanystropheus. Tanystropheus fossai, from the Norian-age Argillite di Riva di Solto in Italy, was given its own genus Sclerostropheus in 2019.

Anatomy 
Tanystropheus was the one of the longest known non-archosauriform archosauromorphs. Vertebrae referred to "T. conspicuus" may correspond to an animal up to five or six meters (16.4 to 20 feet) in length. T. hydroides was around the same size, with the largest specimens at around 5.25 meters (17.2 feet). T. longobardicus was significantly smaller, with an absolute maximum size of two meters (6.6 feet). Despite the large size of some Tanystropheus species, the animal was lightly built. One mass estimate used crocodiles as a density guideline for a 3.6 meter (11.8 feet) long model Tanystropheus skeleton. For a Tanystropheus individual of that length, the weight estimate varied between 32.9 kg (72.5 lbs) and 74.8 kg (164.9 lbs), depending on the volume estimation method. This was significantly lighter than crocodiles of the same length, and more similar to large lizards.

Skull of Tanystropheus longobardicus 

The skull of Tanystropheus longobardicus is roughly triangular when seen from the side and top, narrowing towards the snout. Each premaxilla (the toothed bone at the tip of the snout) has a long tooth row, with six teeth. The premaxillary teeth are conical, fluted by longitudinal ridges, and have subthecodont implantation, meaning that the inner wall of each tooth socket is lower than the outer wall. The premaxilla meets the maxilla (the succeeding toothed bone) along a long, slanted contact. This shape is produced by an elongated postnarial process (rear prong) of the premaxilla, which extends below and behind the nares (nostril holes). The nasals (bones at the top edge of the snout) are poorly known, but were likely narrow and flat. A 2020 reinvestigation revealed that the front part of the nasals and the inner spur of the premaxillae are too short to keep the nares divided. This leaves a single central narial opening for the nostrils, opening upwards. An undivided naris is seen in few other archosauromorphs, namely rhynchosaurs, most allokotosaurs, modern crocodilians, and Teyujagua.

The maxilla is triangular, peaking at mid-length and tapering to the front and rear. There were up to 14 or 15 teeth in the maxilla, though some individuals had fewer. T. longobardicus was a reptile with heterodont dentition, meaning that it had more than one type of tooth shape. In contrast to the simple fang-like premaxillary teeth, most or all of the maxillary teeth have a distinctive tricuspid shape, meaning that the crown was split into three stout triangular cusps (points). The central cusp was larger than the other two cusps, positioned in front and behind it on the crown. Among Triassic reptiles, early pterosaurs such as Eudimorphodon developed an equivalent tooth shape, and tricuspid teeth can also be found in a few modern lizard species. Some individuals of T. longobardicus have tricuspid teeth along their entire maxilla, while in others up to seven maxillary teeth are single-cusped fangs similar to the premaxillary teeth.

The front edge of each orbit (eye socket) is marked by two bones; the prefrontal is tall and projects a low vertical ridge in front of the orbit. The small, sliver-shaped lacrimal is nestled further down along the maxilla. The lower edge of the orbit is formed by the jugal, a bone with a slender anterior process (front branch) and a somewhat broader dorsal process (upper branch). There is also a very short pointed posterior process (rear branch) which ends freely and fails to contact any other bone. The shape of the jugal in Tanystropheus is typical for early archosauromorphs; the underdeveloped posterior process indicates that the margin of the infratemporal fenestra (lower skull hole behind the eye) was incomplete and open from below. The postorbital bone, which links the jugal to the top of the skull, was tall and roughly boomerang-shaped, though poor preservation obscures some details. The squamosal bone, which extends behind the postorbital, is also poorly known in T. longobardicus, and many putative squamosal fossils in the species have been reinterpreted as displaced postorbitals. The quadrate bone, which forms the rear edge of the skull and upper half of the jaw joint, is wide and tall. It has a strong lateral crest and a low pterygoid ramus (a vertical internal plate, articulating with the pterygoid bone in the roof of the mouth). No fossils of T. longobardicus preserve a quadratojugal, a bone which normally lies along the quadrate at the rear lower corner of the skull. Nevertheless, a quadratojugal was likely present in the species, since it occurs in T. hydroides and nearly every other early archosauromorph.

The frontals (skull roof bones above the orbits) have been described as “axe-shaped flanges”, projecting broad curved plates above each orbit. They are narrowest at the front, together terminating at a three-lobed contact with the nasals. The frontals connect to each other and their neighboring bones along coarse interdigitating (interlocking) sutures. A small triangular bone, the postfrontal, wedges behind the rear outer corner of each frontal. A pair of larger plate-like bones, the parietals, sit directly behind the frontals on the skull roof. In T. longobardicus, the parietals are fairly broad and flat, with a shallowly concave outer edge. Like the frontals, the paired parietals are seemingly separate bones, unfused to each other in every member of the species. A large hole, the pineal foramen (sometimes called the parietal foramen), lies along the midline of the skull at the front of the parietals. When seen from below, a pair of curved crests along the frontals and parietals mark the edge of the forebrain, as defined by a bulbous central hollow.

The eye was supported by more than 10 rectangular ossicles (tiny plate-like bones) connecting into a scleral ring, though a full reconstruction of the ring, with 18 ossicles, is conjectural. Few details of the braincase and palate (bony roof of the mouth) are known for T. longobardicus. The scant available evidence suggests that these regions of the skull are rather unspecialized in this species. The vomers (front components of the palate) were narrow and dotted with at least nine tiny teeth. The succeeding palatine and pterygoid bones were also supplied with rows of teeth: up to six relatively large teeth in the former and at least 12 small teeth in the latter. Teeth on the vomers, palatines, and pterygoids are the norm in early archosauromorphs and reptiles as a whole.

The lower jaw is slender, and most of its length is devoted to the toothed dentary bone. The dentary is downturned at its tip and its outer surface is dotted with a row of prominent foramina (blood vessel pits). There are up to 19 teeth in the dentary. Most commonly, the first six teeth are prominent conical fangs, akin to the premaxilla, while the remainder are small and tricuspid, akin to the maxilla. There is some variation in the number of each tooth shape, and some individuals may have up to 11 conical teeth. The inner surface of the dentary is joined by a splint-shaped bone, the splenial, at its lower edge. The splenial was most likely not visible in lateral view. At its rear, the dentary seems to be partially overlapped by the surangular, a bone which comprises much of the rear part of the jaw. Although it is plausible that a small coronoid bone could be present in front of the surangular, evidence is ambiguous at best for all Tanystropheus species. A sheathe-like bone, the angular, is well-exposed under the dentary and surangular, though sutures between these bones are difficult to interpret with certainty. The joint at the back of the jaw lies on the articular, a lumpy rectangular bone which is floored and reinforced by a similar bone: the prearticular. In Tanystropheus species with known skull material, both the articular and prearticular contribute equally to a segment of the jaw extending back beyond the level of the jaw joint. This feature, known as a retroarticular process, is enlarged to a similar degree to that of early rhynchosaurs.

Skull of Tanystropheus hydroides 

The skull of Tanystropheus hydroides is broader and flatter than that of T. longobardicus. The first five of six teeth in the premaxilla are very large and fang-like, forming an interlocking “fish trap” similar to Dinocephalosaurus and many sauropterygians such as plesiosaurs and nothosaurs. All teeth in the skull have a single cusp which is sharp, curved, and unserrated. They have an oval-shaped cross section and shallow subthecodont implantation. Like T. longobardicus, T. hydroides has a single central narial opening. Unlike T. longobardicus, T. hydroides has a nearly vertical rear edge of the premaxilla, without a postnarial process. The maxilla is low, with a large and rectangular front portion. There is a perforation near the front of the bone, which would have been penetrated by the tenth dentary tooth when the mouth was closed. Towards the rear, the maxilla develops into a concave edge overlooking a long and slender posterior process (rear branch) that projects under the rounded orbit. There are 15 teeth in the maxilla, increasing in size up to the eighth tooth, which is about as large as the premaxillary fangs. T.hydroides is not known to possess a septomaxilla, a neomorphic bone at the rear tip of the naris in some reptiles. The nasals are broad and plate-like, with a depressed central portion. The lacrimal and prefrontal, though incompletely known, were likely similar to those of T. longobardicus. T. hydroides has a particularly large nasolacrimal duct, a tubular channel opening out of the rear of the lacrimal. The frontals are quite wide and form much of the upper edge of the orbit, a condition akin to T. longobardicus. However, the paired frontals meet along a straight suture with a low ridge on the lower (internal) surface, in contrast to T. longobardicus, where the frontals meet at an interdigitating suture with a broad furrow on the underside.The parietals are strongly modified in T. hydroides. They are fused into a single X-shaped bone, somewhat resembling the parietals of erythrosuchids. This shape may have resulted from fusion between the parietals’ anterolateral processes (front branches) and the postfrontals, which are separate bones in T. longobardicus but not apparent in T. hydroides. A prominent pineal foramen is positioned near the straight contact with the frontals, one of the few similarities with T. longobardicus. Strong supratemporal fossae excavate into the outer edge of the parietal and define a low sagittal crest along the midline of the skull. This trend is shared with other large archosauromorphs, like Dinocephalosaurus and Azendohsaurus. The supratemporal fenestrae (upper skull holes behind the eye) are wide and roughly triangular, exposed almost entirely from above. The postorbital has large and blocky ventral and medial processes (lower and inward branches), which meet at a sharper angle than in any other early archosauromorph. The jugal, conversely, is basically indistinguishable from that of T. longobardicus. The squamosal is deep and rectangular when viewed from the side, with little differentiation between the tall suture with the postorbital and the small suture with the quadratojugal. As a result, most of the posterior skull is clustered together, and the infratemporal fenestra is reduced to a small diagonal hole. The quadratojugal is a curved sliver which twists back alongside the quadrate. Relative to T. longobardicus, the quadrate has a larger pterygoid ramus and a strongly hooked rearward projection at its upper extent.

The palate of T. hydroides has several unique traits. The vomers are wide and tongue-shaped, each hosting a single row of 15 relatively large curved teeth along the outer edge of the bone, adjacent to the elongated choanae (internal openings of the nasal cavity). Other archosauromorphs, T. longobardicus included, generally have restricted vomers with rows of minuscule teeth. The rest of the palate is completely toothless in T. hydroides, even the palatines and pterygoids, which bear tooth rows in most early archosauromorphs. The pterygoids are also unusual for their broad palatal ramus (front plate) and a loose, strongly overlapping connection to the ectopterygoids (linking bones between the pterygoid and maxilla). The epipterygoids (vertical bones in front of the braincase) are tall and flattened from the side.

T. hydroides is a rare example of an early archosauromorph with a three-dimensionally preserved braincase. The basioccipital (rear lower component of the braincase) was small, with inset basitubera (vertical plates connecting to neck muscles) linked by a transverse ridge, similar to allokotosaurs and archosauriforms. The parabasisphenoid (front lower component) is less specialized; it lies flat and tapers forwards to a blade-like cultriform process. The rear part of the bone has a deep triangular excavation (known as a median pharyngeal recess) on its underside, flanked by low crests and a pair of small basipterygoid processes (knobs connecting to the pterygoid). The remainder of the braincase is fully fused together into a strongly ossified composite bone, and its constituents must be estimated by comparison to other reptiles. The exoccipitals, which mostly encompass the foramen magnum (spinal cord hole), are perforated with nerve foramina. Each exoccipital merges outwards into the opisthotic, which sends out a straight, elongated paroccipital process (thick outer branch) to the edge of the cranium. In T. longobardicus, the paroccipital processes are shorter and narrower at their base. The stapes, a bone which transmits vibrations from the ear to the braincase, is slender and splits into two small prongs where it contacts the opisthotic. The opisthotic merges forwards into the prootic, which extensively contacts the parabasisphenoid and hosts a range of larger nerve foramina. The prootic forms much of the front edge of the paroccipital process, akin to the condition in archosauriforms. Another archosauriform-like feature is the presence of a laterosphenoid, an additional braincase component in front of the prootic and above the exit hole for the trigeminal nerve (also known as cranial nerve V). The laterosphenoid is small, similar to the condition in Azendohsaurus. The upper rear part of the braincase is formed by the supraoccipitals, which were presumably fused together as a continuous surface sloping smoothly down to the foramen magnum.

In the lower jaw, the dentaries meet each other at a robust symphysis with an interdigitating suture. The front end of the dentary hosts a prominent keel on its lower edge, a unique trait of the species. There were at least 18 dentary teeth; the first three are by far the largest teeth in the skull, forming the lower half of the interlocking “fish trap” with the premaxilla. Most other teeth in the dentary are small, with the exception of the tenth tooth, which juts up to pierce the maxilla. The remainder of the jaw contains the same set of bones as in T. longobardicus, but some details differ in T. hydroides. For example, the splenial is plate-like and covers a larger portion of the internal dentary than in T. longobardicus. In addition, the rear of the dentary overlaps a large portion of the surangular, rather than the surangular acting as the overlapping bone where they meet. The surangular internally bears a large fossa for the jaw's adductor (vertical biting) muscles, and a prominent surangular foramen is positioned in front of the jaw joint.

Neck 

The most recognisable feature of Tanystropheus is its hyperelongate neck, equivalent to the combined length of the body and tail. Tanystropheus had 13 massive cervical (neck) vertebrae, though the first two were smaller and less strongly developed. The atlas (first cervical), which connects to the skull, is a small, four-part bone complex. It consists of an atlantal intercentrum (small lower component) and pleurocentrum (large lower component), and a pair of atlantal neural arches (prong-like upper components). There does not appear to be a proatlas, which slots between the atlas and skull in some other reptiles. The intercentrum and pleurocentrum are not fused to each other, unlike the fused atlas of allokotosaurs. The tiny crescent-shaped intercentrum is overlain by a semicircular pleurocentrum, which acts as a base to the backswept neural arches. The axis (second cervical) is larger, with a small axial intercentrum followed by a much larger axial pleurocentrum. The axial pleurocentrum is longer than tall, has a low neural spine set forwards, and small prezygapophyses (front articular plates). The large postzygophyses (rear articular plates) are separated by a broad trough and support pointed epipophyses (additional projections).

The third to eleventh cervicals are hyperelongate in T. longobardicus and T. hydroides, ranging from three to 15 times longer than tall. They are somewhat less elongated in T. antiquus, less than 6 times longer than tall. The cervicals gradually increase in size and proportional length, with the ninth cervical typically being the largest vertebra in the skeleton. In general structure, the elongated cervicals resemble the axial pleurocentrum. However, the axis also has a keel on its underside and an incomplete neural canal, unlike its immediate successors. In the rest of the cervicals, all but the front of each neural spine is so low that it is barely noticeable as a thin ridge. The zygapophyses are closely set and tightly connected between vertebrae. The epipophyses develop into hooked spurs. The cervicals are also compressed from the side, so they are taller than wide. Many specimens have a longitudinal lamina (ridge) on the side of each cervical. Ventral keels return to vertebrae in the rear half of the neck.

The 12th cervical and its corresponding ribs, though still longer than tall, are notably shorter than their predecessors. The 12th cervical has a prominent neural spine and robust zygapophyses, also unlike its predecessors. The 13th vertebra has long been assumed to be the first dorsal (torso) vertebra. This was justified by its general stout shape and supposedly dichocephalous (two-headed) rib facets, unlike the cervicals. However, specimen GMPKU-P-1527 has shown that the 13th vertebra’s rib simply possessed a single wide articulation and an unconnected forward branch, more similar to the cervical ribs than the dorsal ribs.

All cervicals, except potentially the atlas, connected to holocephalous (single-headed) cervical ribs via facets at their front lower corner. Each cervical rib bears a short stalk connecting to two spurs running under and parallel to the vertebrae. The forward-projecting spurs were short and stubby, while the rear-projecting spurs were extremely narrow and elongated, up to three times longer than their respective vertebrae. This bundle of rod-like bones running along the neck afforded a large degree of rigidity.

Torso and tail 

There are 12 dorsal (torso) vertebrae, which are smaller and less specialised than the cervicals. Though their neural spines are taller than those of the cervicals, they are still usually rather short. The dorsal ribs are double-headed close to the shoulder and single-headed in the rest of the torso, sitting on stout transverse processes in the front half of each vertebra. More than 20 angled rows of gastralia extend along the belly, each gastral element represented by a pair of segmented rods which intermingle at the midline.

The two sacral (hip) vertebrae are low but robust, bridging over to the hip with expanded sacral ribs. The latter sacral rib is a single unit without a bifurcated structure. The tail is long, with at least 30 and possible up to 50 caudal vertebrae. The first few caudals are large, with closely interlinked zygapophyses and widely projecting pleurapophyses (transverse processes without ribs). The length of the pleurapophyses decreases until they disappear between the eighth and thirteenth caudal. The height of the neural spines also decreases gradually down the tail. A row of long chevrons is present under a short portion of the tail, though not immediately behind the hips.

Shoulder and forelimbs 

The pectoral girdle (shoulder girdle) has a fairly standard form shared with other tanystropheids. The clavicles (collarbones) were curved and slightly twisted rods. They along the front edge of the interclavicle, a plate-like bone at the center of the chest with a rhombic (broad, diamond-shaped) front region followed by a long stalk at the rear. The interclavicle is rarely preserved and its connections to the rest of the pectoral girdle are mostly inferred from Macrocnemus. The scapula (upper shoulder blade) has the form of a large semicircular plate on a short, broad stalk. It lies above, the coracoid (lower shoulder blade), which is a large oval-shaped plate with a broad glenoid facet (shoulder socket).

The humerus (upper arm bone) is straight and slightly constricted at the middle. Near the elbow it is expanded and twisted, with ectepicondylar groove on its outer edge. The radius (outer forearm bone) is slender and somewhat curved, while the ulna (inner forearm bone) is similar in shape to the humerus and lacks a distinct olecranon (elbow projection). There are four carpals (wrist bones): the ulnare, radiale, and two distal carpals. The ulnare and radiale are large and cuboid, enclosing a small foramen (gap) between them. The larger outer distal carpal connects to metacarpals III and IV, while the much smaller inner distal carpal connects to metacarpals II and III. Metacarpals III and IV are the largest bones in the hand, followed closely by metacarpal II. Metacarpals I and V are both short. The hand’s phalangeal formula (joints per finger) is 2-3-4-4-3. The terminal phalanges (fingertips) would have formed thick, blunt claws.

Hip and hindlimbs 

The components of the pelvis (hip) are proportionally small, though their shape is also nothing unusual relative to other tanystropheids. The ilium (upper hip blade) is low and extends to a tapered point at the rear. The pubis (lower front hip blade) is vertically oriented, with a small but distinct obturator foramen and a concave rear edge. The lower edge of the large, fan-shaped ischium (lower rear hip blade) converges towards the pubis, but does not contact it. The large oval-shaped gap between the pubis and ischium is known as the thyroid foramen.

Two pairs of large, curved bones, known as heterotopic ossifications, sit behind the hips in about half of known specimens preserving the area. These bones are possibly sexually dimorphic, and have also been reported in the small American tanystropheid Tanytrachelos. Heterotopic ossifications may be linked to reproductive biology, supporting reproductive organs (if they belong to males) or an egg pouch (if they belong to females).

The hindlimbs are significantly larger than the forelimbs, though similar in overall structure and proportions. The femur (thigh bone) is long, slender, and sigmoid (curved at both ends). It has a longitudinal muscle scar (the internal trochanter) on its underside and a broad joint at the acetabulum (hip socket). The tibia and fibula (shin bones) are straight, with the former much thicker and more expanded at the knee. The large proximal tarsals (ankle bones) consist of a rounded calcaneum and a blocky astragalus, which meet along a straight or shallowly indented contact in most specimens. Unlike most early archosauromorphs, Tanystropheus has only two pebble-shaped distal tarsals: the larger fourth distal tarsal and minuscule third distal tarsal. There are five closely-appressed metatarsals, with the fourth and third being the longest. Though the first four metatarsals are slender and similar in length, the fifth (outermost) is very stout and subtly hooked, slotting into the ankle along a smooth joint. The estimated phalangeal formula is 2-3-4-5-4. The first phalange of the fifth toe was very long, filling a metatarsal-like role as seen in other tanystropheids.

Classification

Historical interpretations (1920s-1980s) 
Knowledge on the anatomy of Tanystropheus was transformed by Bernhard Peyer’s discoveries in the 1920s and 1930s, but its relationship to other reptiles remained enigmatic for much of the 20th century. Most paleontologists (including modern authorities) agree that Tanystropheus was closely related to Macrocnemus, a smaller and less specialized reptile found in the same geological strata. Beyond this conclusion, Peyer initially suggested that Tanystropheus was related to other long-necked Triassic reptiles. Sauropterygians such as plesiosaurs and nothosaurs were one possibility, and another was the fragmentary German reptile Trachelosaurus. Later, Peyer classified Tanystropheus and Macrocnemus closer to “protorosaurs”, a term initially used for Permian reptiles such as Protorosaurus and Araeoscelis.

In the early and mid-20th century, it was commonplace for Permian and Triassic reptiles of uncertain affinity to intermingle together in classification schemes. Names such as “Eosuchia”, “Euryapsida”, "Younginiformes", “Protorosauria”, and others were all applied by different authors with little consistency. The Early Triassic reptile Prolacerta, from South Africa, also became involved upon its discovery. Prolacerta was the namesake of yet another term introduced into the convoluted space of reptile taxonomy: “Prolacertiformes”.

As the century progressed, two competing hypotheses for the affinities of Tanystropheus developed from the groundwork set by Peyer. Both hypotheses were justified by patterns of skull fenestration (the shape of holes in the skull behind the eye) and cranial kinesis (the flexibility of joints within the skull). One idea was that Tanystropheus and kin (particularly Macrocnemus and Prolacerta) were ancestral to “lacertilian”, an antequated term for lizards. This hypothesis was supported up until the 1980s by German and Swiss paleontologists, including Rupert Wild, and Peyer’s successor at Zürich, Emil Kuhn-Schnyder. The other idea maintained that Tanystropheus was a “protorosaur”, closer to Protorosaurus and Araeoscelis and unrelated to Prolacerta. This was popular among American paleontologists like Alfred Romer. Some publications from the mid-20th century argued that "protorosaurs" were "euryapsids" (reptiles with only an upper temporal fenestra) related to sauropterygians, though later accounts admitted that Euryapsida was likely polyphyletic, with its members lacking a common ancestor.

In 1975, a paper by South African paleontologist C.E. Gow argued that none of these hypotheses were entirely correct. He proposed that Prolacerta, and by extension Macrocnemus and Tanystropheus, occupied an extinct spur on the reptile family tree near the ancestry of archosaurs, a diverse group of reptiles with lightweight skulls and serrated teeth set in deep sockets. Dinosaurs are among the most famous subset of archosaurs, as are modern crocodilians and their prehistoric ancestors. Many newly discovered "prolacertiforms", including Tanystropheus-, Protorosaurus-, and Prolacerta-like species, were described in the 1970s, not long after the field of paleontology was reinvigorated by the “dinosaur renaissance” in the 1960s and beyond.

Cladistics and Archosauromorpha (1980s-1990s) 
In the 1980s, the advent of cladistics saw a paradigm shift in the field of taxonomy, emphasizing monophyletic clades (all-encompassing groups defined by shared ancestry) over other categorization styles. Phylogenetic analyses were invented to evaluate reptile evolution in a quantitative manner, by collecting a set of characteristics in sampled species and then using computational models to find the simplest (most parsimonious) path evolution could take to produce that character distribution. Cladistics stabilized and defined a fundamental split in the family tree of reptiles: one side of the family tree, Lepidosauromorpha, leads to lepidosaurs such as squamates (lizards and snakes) and the tuatara. The other side, Archosauromorpha, leads to archosaurs. Cladistics was one of many lines of evidence that helped to demonstrate the dinosaurian origin of birds. This left crocodilians and birds as the two surviving archosaur groups.

A series of phylogenetic analyses in the late 1980s and 1990s strongly supported the proposal of Gow (1975). Tanystropheus, Macrocnemus, Protorosaurus, and Prolacerta were always placed as members of Archosauromorpha, closer to archosaurs than to squamates. “Protorosauria” and “Prolacertiformes” were used interchangeably for the archosauromorph subgroup encompassing these superficially lizard-like reptiles. Some authors preferred “Protorosauria” for its priority. Most others used "Prolacertiformes" arguing that "Protorosauria" was a name that carried too much historical baggage, since it had previously encompassed non-archosauromorph “euryapsids” like Araeoscelis.

As a "prolacertiform", Tanystropheus is typically considered the sister taxon to Tanytrachelos, a much smaller tanystropheid from Virginia. Another small tanystropheid, Cosesaurus from Spain, is allied with the Tanystropheus + Tanytrachelos clade in many analyses of the 1980s and 1990s. Within Archosauromorpha, “prolacertiforms” are joined by several other groups. The clade Archosauriformes is a diverse archosauromorph subset including crown group archosaurs and their predatory close relatives such as Euparkeria and Proterosuchus. Stocky Triassic herbivores like rhynchosaurs, Trilophosaurus, and azendohsaurids additionally qualify as archosauromorphs. The bizarre chameleon-like drepanosaurs were also included by many analyses, though more recently they have been reinterpreted as a more basal type of reptile unrelated to Archosauromorpha.

The following cladogram is from Dilkes (1998), a study with a small sample of "prolacertiforms" but closer resemblance to most analyses of the 2000s and 2010s:

Recent studies and the rejection of "prolacertiform" monophyly (2000s-present) 
Starting with Dilkes (1998), phylogenetic analyses began to recover Prolacerta in a position close to archosauriforms and away from other "prolacertiforms". In addition, a 2009 redescription of Protorosaurus shifted it away from Tanystropheus and close to the base of Archosauromorpha. These results have driven paleontologists to the conclusion that "Protorosauria" / "Prolacertiformes" is not a natural clade and fails to adequately describe the structure of Archosauromorpha. In the modern cladistic framework, it could be considered a paraphyletic or polyphyletic category of archosauromorphs united by "primitive" characteristics (such as a slender neck and lizard-like body) rather than a shared evolutionary history.

The family Tanystropheidae has come to succeed those older names, acting as a monophyletic clade oriented around Tanystropheus. Tanystropheidae hosts a growing list of former "protorosaurs" with closer affinities to Tanystropheus than to Prolacerta, Protorosaurus, or other major archosauromorph groups. Tanystropheus is well-nested within Tanystropheidae, often as the sister taxon to Amotosaurus. Macrocnemus is most commonly the basal-most (first diverging) tanystropheid.

The following cladogram is from Pritchard et al. (2015), a study focused specifically on tanystropheids:

The following cladogram is from Ezcurra (2016), a study focused generally on archosauromorphs and early archosauriforms:

A set of phylogenetic analyses by Spiekman et al. (2021) attempted to tackle the question of “protorosaur” relationships using an expanded and updated sample of archosauromorph species described over the past few decades. Tanystropheus was split into five taxonomic units in this study: T. longobardicus, T. hydroides, T. “conspicuus”, “T. antiquus” (Protanystropheus), and GMPKU P1527 (the large Chinese Tanystropheus specimen). Two types of analyses were designed to test for bias: one disregarded non-discrete characters and character state ordering, while the other included these settings. In some analyses, “wildcard” taxa with inconsistent positions were excluded to improve resolution.

Regardless of the setting, T. longobardicus, T. hydroides, T. “conspicuus”, and GMPKU P1527 always formed a clade, though the latter two were excluded from some analyses as “wildcards”. Under some settings (but not the most stable analysis), another tanystropheid was added to this clade: Raibliania calligarisi, from the Carnian of Italy. The main Tanystropheus clade was well-nested within Tanystropheidae. “Tanystropheus antiquus”, whenever included in an analysis, was never found to clade with the other Tanystropheus taxa. Instead, it was consistently allied with Dinocephalosaurus and Pectodens, forming the newly named clade Dinocephalosauridae, outside of Tanystropheidae. Sclerostropheus fossai, another species formerly referred to Tanystropheus, was an unpredictable “wildcard”, sometimes placed within Dinocephalosauridae and other times within Tanystropheidae.

The following cladogram is from the most stable analysis preferred by Spiekman et al. (2021), with ratio (continuous) characters included, certain characters ordered, and five wildcard taxa excluded: Czatkowiella harae, Tanystropheus “conspicuus”, “Tanystropheus antiquus", Orovenator mayorum and Elessaurus gondwanoccidens.

Paleoecology

Diet 
The diet of Tanystropheus has been controversial in the past, although most recent studies consider it a piscivorous (fish-eating) reptile. The teeth at the front of the narrow snout were long, conical, and interlocking, similar to those of nothosaurs and plesiosaurs. This was likely an adaptation for catching aquatic prey. Additionally, hooklets from cephalopod tentacles and what may be fish scales have been found near the belly regions of some specimens, further support for a piscivorous lifestyle.

However, small specimens of the genus possess an additional, more unusual form of teeth. This form of teeth, which occurred in the rear part of the jaws behind the interlocking front teeth, were tricuspid (three-pronged), with a long and pointed central cusp and smaller cusps in front of and behind the central cusp. Wild (1974) considered these three-cusped teeth to be an adaptation for gripping insects. Cox (1985) noted that marine iguanas also had three-cusped teeth, and that Tanystropheus likely fed on marine algae like that species of lizard. Taylor (1989) rejected both of these hypotheses, as he considered the neck of Tanystropheus to be too inflexible for the animal to be successful at either diet.

The most likely function of these teeth, as explained by Nosotti (2007), was that they assisted the piscivorous diet of the reptile by helping to grip slippery prey such as fish or squid. Several modern species of seals, such as the hooded seal and crabeater seal, also have multi-cusped teeth which assist their diet to a similar effect. Similar teeth patterns have also been found in the pterosaur Eudimorphodon and the fellow tanystropheid Langobardisaurus, both of whom are considered piscivores. They also lack teeth on the pterygoid and palatine bones on the roof of the mouth, which possess teeth in smaller specimens. The two morphotypes were originally considered to represent juvenile and adult specimens of T. longobardicus. However, histology of the small specimens and restudy of the large specimens has shown that they each represent adult forms of two different species. The larger one-cusped morphotype was given a new species, T. hydroides, while the smaller tricuspid morphotype retained the name T. longobardicus.

Paleobiology

Skull biomechanics 
In T. hydroides, the connection between the quadrate and squamosal is loose, with the upper extremity of the quadrate hooking into a deep concavity on the squamosal. This would have enabled a degree of flexibility along the quadrate-squamosal contact, allowing the quadrate to swivel around an otic joint. This a condition is a form of cranial kinesis (movement among bones in the cranium) known as streptostyly, which is found in some living lizards. The quadrate is also loosely connected to the pterygoid, and the quadratojugal fails to contact the jugal, two qualities which allow movement of the quadrate without hindrance. While streptostyly is possible in the reconstructed skull, it cannot be demonstrated whether it was actively used by the living animal.

Fragments of rod-like hyobranchial elements (throat bones) have been found in fossils of both T. hydroides and T. longobardicus. These hyobranchials are very slender and disarticulated, without a bony corpus (thickened “body” of the hyoid apparatus) to connect elements from either side of the throat. These traits indicate that Tanystropheus relied on biting and enlarged teeth to capture prey. Suction feeding is rejected, since it is correlated with a more robust and integrated hyoid apparatus.

Soft tissue 
A specimen described by Renesto in 2005 displayed an unusual "black material" around the rear part of the body, with smaller patches in the middle of the back and tail. Although most of the material was amorphous, the portion just in front of the hip seemingly preserved scale impressions, indicating that the black material was the remnants of soft tissue. The scales seem to be semi-rectangular and do not overlap with each other, similar to the integument reported in a juvenile Macrocnemus described in 2002. The portion of the material at the base of the tail is particularly thick and rich in phosphate. Many small spherical structures are also present in this portion, which upon further preparation were revealed to be composed of calcium carbonate. These chemicals suggest that the black material was formed as a product of the specimen's proteins decaying in a warm, stagnant, and acidic environment. As in Macrocnemus, the concentration of this material at the base of the tail suggests that the specimen had a quite noticeable amount of muscle behind its hips.

Brain and inner ear 
Impressions on the frontal bones of Tanystropheus longobardicus fossils indicate that that species at least had a bulbous forebrain with paired olfactory bulbs. The complete braincase of Tanystropheus hydroides specimen PIMUZ T 2790 allowed for a partial reconstruction of the brain cavity and inner ear via a digital endocast. The flocculus is large and broad and leads forward to a cerebellum which is narrowest between the endosseus labyrinth (inner ear canals). A large flocculus may relate to greater head and eye stabilization, though evidence is inconclusive. Long-necked sauropods show a reduction of the flocculus and there is no clear correlation between flocculus size and function in modern mammals and birds. Like other reptiles, Tanystropheus has three thin semicircular canals ringing out of the inner ear. Tanystropheus likely stayed in shallow waters or on land, since it lacks the thick semicircular canals of deep-diving seabirds. The anterior semicircular canal, which curves up and around the flocculus, is enlarged. The posterior semicircular canal (which slopes backwards and outwards from the brain) is smaller, as is the lateral semicircular canal (which arches outwards). The lateral semicircular canal is nearly horizontal in orientation, which possibly relates to a horizontal head posture. There is also a long straight cochlear duct extending outwards, and a long cochlear duct typically indicates good hearing ability in living reptiles.

Terrestrial capabilities 
The lifestyle of Tanystropheus is controversial, with different studies favoring a terrestrial or aquatic lifestyle for the animal. Major studies on Tanystropheus anatomy and ecology by Rupert Wild in the 1970s argued that it was an active terrestrial predator, keeping its head held high with an S-shaped flexion. Though this interpretation is not wholly consistent with its proposed neck biomechanics, more recent studies have supported the idea that Tanystropheus was fully capable of movement on land.

Renesto (2005) argued that Tanystropheus lacked clear adaptations for underwater swimming. The tail of Tanystropheus was compressed vertically (from top-to-bottom) at the base and thinned towards the tip, so that it would have been useless for lateral (side-to-side) movement. The long neck and short front limbs compared to the long hind limbs would have made four-limbed swimming inefficient and unstable if that was the preferred form of locomotion. Thrusting with only the hind limbs, as in swimming frogs, was also considered an inefficient form of locomotion for a large animal such as Tanystropheus, although a later study found support for this hypothesis.

Renesto (2005) argued that the neck of Tanystropheus was lighter than previously suggested, and that the entire front half of the body was more lightly-built than the rear half, which would have possessed a large amount of muscle mass. In addition to strengthening the hind limbs, the large hip and tail muscles would have shifted the animal's center of mass rearwards, stabilizing the animal as it maneuvered its elongated neck. Weak development of cervical spines suggest that epaxial musculature was underdeveloped in Tanystropheus, and that intrinsic back muscles (e.g., m. longus cervicis) were the driving force behind neck movement. The horizontal overlap between zygapophyses would have limited lateral movement of the neck, while cervical ribs would have formed a brace along the underside of the neck. The long cervical ribs may have played a similar role to ossified tendons of many large dinosaurs, transmitting the forces from the weight of head and neck down to the pectoral girdle, as well as providing passive support by limiting dorsoventral flexion.

In 2015, paleoartist Mark Witton estimated that the neck made up only 20% of the entire animal's mass due to its light and hollow vertebrae. By comparison, in pterosaurs of the family Azhdarchidae, which were clearly large terrestrial predators, the neck and head made up almost 50% of their mass. Tanystropheus was also poorly equipped for aquatic life, with the only adaptation being a lengthened fifth toe, which suggests that it visited the water some of the time, though was not wholly dependent on it. Witton proposed that Tanystropheus would have hunted prey from the seashore, akin to a heron. A later estimate argued that the neck comprised about 30 to 43% of the body mass. Terrestrial or semi-terrestrial habits are supported by taphonomic evidence, which indicates that the preservation of Tanystropheus specimens is more similar to the terrestrial Macrocnemus than the aquatic Serpianosaurus where all three co-occur. Renesto and Franco Saller's 2018 follow-up to Renesto (2005) offered more information on the reconstructed musculature of Tanystropheus. This study determined that the first few tail vertebrae of Tanystropheus would have housed powerful tendons and ligaments that would have made the body more stiff, keeping the belly off the ground and preventing the neck from pulling the body over.

Aquatic capabilities 
In the 1980s, a number of studies suggested that Tanystropheus lacked the musculature to raise its neck above the ground, and that it was likely completely aquatic, swimming by undulating its body and tail side-to-side like a snake or crocodile. This interpretation has been disputed by later paleontologists, although Tanystropheus may have still spent a large portion of its life in shallow water.

Renesto (2005) argued that Tanystropheus lacked clear adaptations for underwater swimming to the same degree as most other aquatic reptiles. The tail of Tanystropheus was compressed vertically (from top-to-bottom) at the base and thinned towards the tip, so it would not have been useful as a fin for lateral (side-to-side) movement. The long neck and short front limbs shifted the center of mass back to the long hind limbs, which would have made four-limbed swimming inefficient and unstable if that was the preferred form of locomotion.

Renesto (2005) suggested that thrusting with only the hind limbs, as in swimming frogs, was an inefficient form of locomotion for a large animal such as Tanystropheus. A follow-up study by Renesto and Saller (2018) came to a different conclusion. They noted that, based on reconstructions of muscle mass, the hind limbs would have been quite flexible and powerful according to muscle correlations on the legs, pelvis, and tail vertebrae. Their proposal was that Tanystropheus, despite its apparent lack of adaptations for typical swimming styles, utilised a more unusual mode of underwater movement: extending the hind limbs forward and then simultaneously retracting them, creating a powerful 'jump' forward. Further support for this hypothesis is based on the ichnogenus (trackway fossil) Gwyneddichnium, which was likely created by small tanystropheids such as Tanytrachelos. Some Gwyneddichnium tracks seem to represent a succession of paired sprawling footprints from the hind limbs, without any hand prints. These tracks may have been created by the same form of movement which Renesto and Saller (2018) hypothesised as the preferred method of swimming in Tanystropheus. The idea that Tanystropheus evolved this form of swimming over much more efficient and specialised styles is evidence that it did not live an exclusively aquatic life, in contrast to longer-lasting marine reptiles such as ichthyosaurs or plesiosaurs.In the lifestyle interpretation of Renesto and Saller (2018), Tanystropheus was a shallow-water predator which used its long neck to stealthily approach schools of fish or squid without disturbing its prey due to its large body size. Upon selecting a suitable prey item, it would have dashed forward by propelling itself along the seabed or through the water, with both hind limbs pushing off at the same time. This style of swimming is most common in amphibious creatures such as frogs, and likewise Tanystropheus would also have been capable of walking around on land.

Semiaquatic habits were also supported in the 2020 study which named Tanystropheus hydroides based on digitally reconstructed skulls. This study noted that both T. hydroides and T. longobardicus had large undivided nares positioned at the upper edge of the snout, a location consistent with semiaquatic habits in other animals. The body would have had a poor hydrodynamic profile and the limbs had only limited adaptions to swimming, suggesting that Tanystropheus lived in shallow coastal areas or even in freshwater.

References

Bibliography 
 George Olshevsky expands on the history of "P." exogyrarum, on the Dinosaur Mailing List
 Huene, 1902. "Übersicht über die Reptilien der Trias" [Review of the Reptilia of the Triassic]. Geologische und Paläontologische Abhandlungen. 6, 1-84.
 Fritsch, 1905. "Synopsis der Saurier der böhm. Kreideformation" [Synopsis of the saurians of the Bohemian Cretaceous formation]. Sitzungsberichte der königlich-böhmischen Gesellschaft der Wissenschaften, II Classe. 1905(8), 1-7.

External links 

Tanystropheids
Prehistoric reptile genera
Olenekian genus first appearances
Anisian genera
Ladinian genera
Carnian genus extinctions
Triassic reptiles of Europe
Triassic Italy
Fossils of Italy
Triassic Switzerland
Fossils of Switzerland
Fossil taxa described in 1852
Taxa named by Christian Erich Hermann von Meyer